The Goat is a 1921 American two-reel silent  comedy film written, directed by, and starring Buster Keaton.

This short contains one of Keaton's more memorable images: A distant, speeding train approaches the camera, and stops with a close-up of Keaton who has been sitting on the front of the train.

Plot 
Buster joins a queue for free bread but does not note that he is standing behind two unmoving mannequins. By the time he spots his mistake the bread is finished.

Next Buster Keaton peers through a barred window into a police station where captured murderer "Dead Shot Dan" is having his picture taken for the "Rogue's Gallery". The photographer does not notice that the lens is covered by Dan's cap. Seeing that the photographer is looking away, Dan moves his head to the side and snaps a picture of Buster without anybody noticing. Thus, when Dan escapes, the wanted posters all show Buster with his hands on the bars. Unaware, Buster moves on to a street corner, where he notices a horseshoe, and kicks it aside. The next man who comes along  picks it up and throws it for good luck. Within seconds the man finds a wallet filled with money. After scrambling to find the horseshoe, Buster picks it up and throws over his shoulder. It strikes a policeman, who chases Buster, and soon other officers join the chase. Buster lures them into the back of a truck, locks them in, and escapes.

Afterwards, Buster sees a man arguing with a young woman walking her dog. Buster defends the woman and throws the man to the ground. After walking away, Buster runs into the officers who had chased him earlier. He escapes by hopping onto a train going to a nearby town. Unfortunately for Buster, the town has heard of Dan's escape, and newspapers and wanted posters with Buster's picture are everywhere. The townspeople run from him in terror wherever he goes.

Buster is once again in the wrong place at the wrong time when the police chief on his patrol is ambushed by a gangster. The gunman's bullets miss the officer, but the smoking gun ends up in Buster's hand. He runs from the persistent police chief, inadvertently causing mischief all over the town. While on the run, Buster encounters the same young woman he assisted earlier, who invites him to dinner. At her home he meets her father—he is the police chief, and he furiously chases Buster all over the apartment complex. After the young woman helps Buster escape, the pair emerge onto the street where Buster observes a sign outside a furniture store that says "You furnish the Girl, we furnish the home!" He carries his date into the store.

Cast
 Buster Keaton
 Virginia Fox as Chief's daughter
 Joe Roberts as Police Chief
 Malcolm St. Clair as Dead Shot Dan (as Mal St. Clair)
 Edward F. Cline as Cop by telephone pole
 Jean C. Havez as Bit part

See also
 List of American films of 1921
 Buster Keaton filmography

References

External links

 
 
 
 The Goat at the International Buster Keaton Society

1921 films
1921 comedy films
1921 short films
American silent short films
Silent American comedy films
American black-and-white films
Films directed by Buster Keaton
Films directed by Malcolm St. Clair
Films produced by Joseph M. Schenck
Films with screenplays by Buster Keaton
Articles containing video clips
1920s American films